The 1944–45 Cornell Big Red men's ice hockey season was the 38th season of play for the program. The teams was coached by Nick Bawlf in his 23rd season.

Season
Cornell began the season as one of just seven operating varsity teams. Despite this, the Big Red were able to play four games during the season. Unfortunately, the team wasn't at the same level of competition as their opponents and lost all four game by a wide margin. Due to the constraints caused by World War II, the student newspaper wasn't published during the school year. As a result, the information for individual games is only available from outside sources.

The team did not name a captain for the season.

Roster

Standings

Schedule and results

|-
!colspan=12 style=";" | Regular Season

References

{{DEFAULTSORT:1944–45 Cornell Big Red men's ice hockey season}
Cornell Big Red men's ice hockey seasons
Cornell
Cornell
Cornell
Cornell